Jim Lynch (1945–2022) was an American football player.

Jim Lynch may also refer to:

Sports
Jim Lynch (Australian footballer) (1882–1919), Australian rules footballer
Jim Lynch (hurler) (born 1943), Irish retired hurler
Jim Lynch (ice hockey) (born 1953), Canadian ice hockey player
Jim Lynch (speed skater) (born 1948), Australian Olympic speed skater
Jim Lynch, former manager of the Great Britain national speedway team

Others
Jim Lynch (conservationist) (born 1947), New Zealand cartoonist and conservationist
Jim Lynch (Survivor), Survivor: Guatemala contestant
Jim Lynch (writer) (born 1961), American novelist and journalist
Jim Lynch (politician) (born 1946), Pennsylvania politician

See also
James Lynch (disambiguation)